Sorrowful and Immaculate Heart of Mary may refer to:
 Sorrowful and Immaculate Heart of Mary (cult), a cult founded in 2002 on Réunion
 Sorrowful and Immaculate Heart of Mary, a devotion of the Seven Sorrows of Mary